I Kiss Your Hand, Madame is a 1929 German drama film directed by Robert Land starring Harry Liedtke and Marlene Dietrich. It was released in the United States in 1932. It was produced by Super-Film. There is no dialogue in the original version of this film, which was silent, apart from the title-song by Ralph Erwin, writing by Fritz Rotter, that had been specially recorded by Richard Tauber to be played during the screening. Tauber himself does not actually appear in the film.

The film's sets were designed by the art director Robert Neppach.

Plot
Madame Gerard is a divorcee living the high life in Paris. Her current lover is the overweight Percy Talandier but then she meets Count Lerski and sets her sights on him. Then she hears from her ex-husband Adolphe that Lerski is not a count, but works as a waiter.

Cast
 Harry Liedtke as Jacques/Count Lerski
 Marlene Dietrich as Laurence Gerard
  as Adolphe Gerard
 Charles Puffy as Percy Talandier
 Richard Tauber as Vocalist

References

Bibliography

External links
 

1929 films
Films of the Weimar Republic
German black-and-white films
German silent feature films
German drama films
1920s German-language films
Films directed by Robert Land
1929 drama films
Transitional sound drama films
Films set in Paris
Films shot in Paris
1920s German films